Calyptotis is a genus of skinks, a type of lizard, found in Australia.

Species
The following four species are recognized as being valid.

 Calyptotis lepidorostrum  – cone-eared calyptotis 
 Calyptotis ruficauda  – red-tailed calyptotis 
 Calyptotis scutirostrum  – scute-snouted calyptotis
 Calyptotis temporalis  – broad-templed calyptotis

References

 
Lizard genera
Skinks of Australia
Endemic fauna of Australia
Taxa named by Charles Walter De Vis